Keegan Meyer (born March 10, 1997) is an American soccer player who plays as a goalkeeper for Charlotte Independence in the USL League One.

Career

College & Amateur
Meyer played college soccer at High Point University from 2015, redshirting his freshman season before going on to play four seasons as starter for the Panthers. Meyer was named All-Big South First Team in three consecutive seasons starting 2017 through to 2019. Meyer finished his time at High Point as the school's all-time leader in career shutouts with 27.

While at college, Meyer also played in the USL League Two with Tormenta FC, Des Moines Menace and Ocean City Nor'easters.

Professional
On January 9, 2020, Meyer was selected 43rd overall pick of the 2020 MLS SuperDraft by New England Revolution. On February 10, 2020, he was signed by the club's USL League One affiliate New England Revolution II.

Meyer made his professional debut on August 21, 2020, starting against Richmond Kickers.

Meyer's contract option was declined by New England on November 30, 2020.

On February 11, 2021, Loudoun United signed Meyer.

Meyer signed with USL League One side Charlotte Independence on March 18, 2022.

On December 4, 2022, Meyer announced his retirement from soccer on his Instagram page.

References

External links
Keegan Meyer - 2019 - Men's Soccer at High Point Athletics
Keegan Meyer | MLSsoccer.com MLS bio
Keegan Meyer | New England Revolution New England Revolution

1997 births
Living people
American soccer players
Association football goalkeepers
Charlotte Independence players
DeMatha Catholic High School alumni
Des Moines Menace players
High Point Panthers men's soccer players
New England Revolution II players
New England Revolution draft picks
Ocean City Nor'easters players
People from Silver Spring, Maryland
Soccer players from Maryland
Sportspeople from Montgomery County, Maryland
Tormenta FC players
USL League One players
USL League Two players